Padoin is an Italian surname that may refer to the following notable people:

Nicola Padoin (born 1979), Italian football midfielder 
Silvio Padoin (1930–2019), Italian Roman Catholic bishop
 Simone Padoin (born 1984), Italian football player

Italian-language surnames